Alloa Junction railway station was located near Plean, Stirling, Scotland, from 1850 to 1865.

History 

There is limited evidence of the station, the OS map for 1862 shows a clear area and a building in the "V" of the junction but it is not labelled as a station. Trains did stop here though, the station featured in Bradshaw's Guide until 1865 with a very limited service, an excursion advertised as running from Greenhill and Alloa was due to call at Alloa Junction on the way to Aberdeen at 5:45 a.m. on 24 June 1851.

The station closed to passengers around the end of 1865, it last appeared in Bradshaw in November 1865.

The line to South Alloa closed to goods on 1 September 1950 and the final section of line to Bandeath Munitions Depot closed on 1 April 1978.

References

Railway stations in Stirling (council area)
Former Caledonian Railway stations
Railway stations in Great Britain opened in 1850
Railway stations in Great Britain closed in 1865
1850 establishments in Scotland
1865 disestablishments in Scotland